Empress Gi or Empress Ki (Hangul: 기황후, Hanja: 奇皇后; 1315–1370(?)), also known as Empress Qi or Öljei Khutuk (Mongolian: Өлзийхутаг), was one of the primary empresses of Toghon Temür (Emperor Huizong) of the Yuan dynasty and the mother of Biligtü Khan (Emperor Zhaozong), who would become an emperor of Northern Yuan. She was originally from an aristocratic family of the Goryeo dynasty and served as concubine of Toghon Temür. During the last years of the Yuan dynasty, she became one of the most powerful women, controlling the country economically and politically.

Biography
Empress Gi was born in Haengju (행주, 幸州; modern Goyang), Goryeo to a lower-ranked aristocratic family of bureaucrats. Her father was Gi Ja-oh. In 1333, the teenage Lady Gi was among the concubines sent to Yuan by the Goryeo king, who had to provide a certain number of beautiful teenage girls to serve as concubines of the Yuan emperor once every three years. It was considered prestigious to marry Goryeo women. Extremely beautiful and skilled at dancing, conversation, singing, poetry, and calligraphy, Lady Gi quickly became the favorite concubine of Toghon Temür. He fell in love with her and it was soon noted that he was spending far more time in her company than he was with the first empress Danashiri.

The primary empress Danashiri was executed on 22 July 1335 in a purge because of the rebellion of her brother . When Toghon Temür tried to promote Lady Gi to secondary wife, which was contrary to the standard practice of only taking secondary wives from the Mongol clans, it created such opposition at court to this unheard of promotion for a Goryeo woman that he was forced to back down. Bayan, who held the real power in Yuan, opposed the promotion of Lady Gi as did the Empress Dowager, who considered Lady Gi to be cunning. In 1339, when Lady Gi gave birth to a son, Ayushiridara, whom Toghon Temür decided would be his successor, he was finally able to have Lady Gi named as his secondary wife in 1340. As the favorite wife of the emperor, Lady Gi was a very powerful woman in Yuan. When Bayan was purged, Lady Gi became the secondary empress in 1340 (the primary empress was Bayan Khutugh of the Khongirad).

Toghon Temür increasingly lost interest in governing as his reign went on. During this time power was increasingly exercised by a politically and economically talented Lady Gi. Lady Gi's older brother  Gi Cheol was appointed the commander of the Mongol Eastern Field Headquarters—making him in effect the real ruler of Goryeo—owing to her influence, and she closely monitored Goryeo affairs. Her son was designated Crown Prince in 1353. Using her eunuch Park Bul-hwa (박불화, 朴不花) as her agent, she began a campaign to force the emperor to pass the imperial throne to her son. However, her intentions became known to the emperor and he grew apart from her.

Depending on Lady Gi's position in the imperial capital, her elder brother Gi Cheol came to threaten the position of the king of Goryeo, which was a client state of the Yuan dynasty. King Gongmin of Goryeo exterminated the Gi family in a coup in 1356 and became independent of the Yuan. Lady Gi responded by selecting Tash Temür as the new king of Goryeo and dispatched troops to Goryeo. However, the Yuan troops were defeated by the army of Goryeo while attempting to cross the Yalu River.

Within the Yuan capital an internal strife was fought between supporters and opponents of the Crown Prince. An opposition leader, Bolud Temür, finally occupied the capital in 1364. Her son fled to Köke Temür who supported him, but Lady Gi was imprisoned by Bolud Temür. Bolud Temür was overthrown by Köke Temür the next year. Once again, she tried to install her son as Khagan, this time with the support of Köke Temür, but in vain. After Bayan Khutugh died, Lady Gi was elevated to the primary empress in December 1365.

The collapse of Yuan dynasty in 1368 forced her to flee to Yingchang's city, today's Inner Mongolia. In 1370, Toghon Temür died and his son ascended to the throne. Empress Gi became the Grand Empress, but soon after that went missing.

Family 
 Great-Great-Grandfather 
 Gi Yun-suk (기윤숙, 奇允肅) (? – 27 April 1257)
 Great-Grandfather
 Gi Hong-yeong (기홍영, 奇洪潁)
 Great-Grandmother
 Princess Consort Im of the Jangheung Im clan (군부인 장흥 임씨, 郡夫人 長興 任氏)
 Grandfather
 Gi Gwan (기관, 奇琯)
 Grandmother
 Princess Consort Yeonheung of the Juksan Park clan (연흥군부인 죽산 박씨, 延興郡夫人 竹山 朴氏)
 Father
 Gi Ja-oh (기자오, 奇子敖) (1266 – 1328)
 Mother
 Lady Yi of the Iksan Yi clan (익산 이씨, 益山 李氏)
 Grandfather: Yi Haeng-geom (이행검, 李行儉) (1225 – 1310)
 Grandmother: Lady Jeong of the Hadong Jeong clan (하동 정씨, 河東 鄭氏)
 Siblings 
 Older brother: Gi Sik (기식, 奇軾); died prematurely
 Older brother: Gi Cheol (기철, 奇轍) (? – 1356)
 Nephew: Gi Yu-geol (기유걸, 奇有傑) (? – 1356)
 Nephew: Gi In-geol (기인걸, 奇仁傑)
 Grandnephew: Gi Shin (기신, 奇愼)
 Great-grandnephew: Gi Seok-sun (기석손, 奇碩孫)
 Grandniece: Lady Gi of the Haengju Gi clan (행주 기씨, 幸州 奇氏)
 Grandnephew-in-law: Park Gyeong (박경, 朴經)
 Nephew: Gi Se-geol (기세걸, 奇世傑)
 Nephew: Gi Saeincheobmok (기새인첩목아, 奇賽因帖木兒)
 Nephew: Gi Sya-in (기샤인, 奇賽因) (? – 1356)
 Niece: Lady Gi of the Haengju Gi clan (행주 기씨, 幸州 奇氏)
 Nephew-in-law: Wang Jong-gwi (왕중귀, 王重貴)
 Older brother: Gi Won (기원, 奇轅)
 Nephew: Gi Wiljeibuka (기욀제이부카, 奇完者不花)
 Older brother: Gi Ju (기주, 奇輈)
 Older brother: Gi Ryun (기륜, 奇輪)
 Husband 
 Toghon Temür (25 May 1320 – 23 May 1370)
 Issue
 Son: Biligtü Khan Ayushiridara (必里克圖汗) (23 January 1340 – 28 April/26 May 1378)
 Daughter-in-law - Empress Gwon of the Andong Gwon clan (권황후, 權皇后) (? – 1378/22 May 1410); daughter of Gwon Gyeom (권겸, 權謙) (? – 1356)
 Prince Maidilibala (26 March 1363 – 16 May 1375)
 Princess Ariun (공주, 公主) (14 September 1377 – 15 February 1423)
Grandson-in-law: Jorightu Khan Yesüder (卓里克圖汗) (1358 – 1392)

In popular culture 
 Portrayed by Kim Hye-ri in 2005 MBC TV series Shin Don.
 Portrayed by Hyun Seung-min and Ha Ji-won in 2013–2014 MBC TV series Empress Ki.

See also
 Imperial Noble Consort Shujia, a Korean concubine of the Qing Qianlong Emperor

References

Bibliography
 

1315 births
1370 deaths
Yuan dynasty empresses
Mongolian people of Korean descent
Chinese people of Korean descent
14th-century Korean people
14th-century Korean women
Haengju Ki clan
14th-century Chinese women
14th-century Chinese people
People from Goyang